Sword Art Online is a science fantasy anime series adapted from the light novel series of the same title written by Reki Kawahara and illustrated by abec. It was produced by A-1 Pictures and directed by Tomohiko Itō. It is divided into the "Aincrad" and "Fairy Dance" arcs, respectively adapted from volumes 1, 2 and one story of 8, and 3&4 from the original material. The story of the first season follows the adventures of Kazuto "Kirito" Kirigaya and Asuna Yuuki, two players who are trapped in the virtual world of "Sword Art Online" (SAO). They are tasked to clear all 100 Floors and defeat the final boss in order to be freed from the game. Three months after the death game, Kazuto discovers that Asuna is being held captive in "ALfheim Online" (ALO), a spiritual successor to SAO, where the players assume the roles of fairies. Kazuto enters the game and allies himself with his sister Suguha "Leafa" Kirigaya to rescue Asuna from captivity.

The series aired from July 8 to December 23, 2012, on Tokyo MX, spanning 25 episodes. It was later broadcast by 12 other stations. Aniplex of America announced that the English dubbed version would air on Adult Swim's Toonami programming block starting on July 28, 2013. The first DVD and Blu-ray Disc volumes were released in Japan on October 24, 2012, and it concluded on June 26, 2013, with all nine volumes containing a bonus  episode. In North America, Aniplex of America released the series in four Blu-ray/DVD volumes on August 13, 2013. In Australasia, Madman Entertainment distributed the four volumes in DVD and Blu-ray format. In Europe, Manga Entertainment first released all four volumes on December 16, 2013. A special episode of the anime titled  was globally released on December 31, 2013. A second season, Sword Art Online II began in July 2014.

Five pieces of theme music were used for the series: two opening themes and three ending themes. For the first 14 episodes, the opening theme song is "Crossing Field" performed by LiSA, and the ending theme is  performed by Haruka Tomatsu. The second opening theme, used from episode 15 onwards, is "Innocence" performed by Eir Aoi. While its second ending theme, used from episodes 15 to 24, is "Overfly" sung by Luna Haruna. The third ending theme, "Crossing Field" was used for the final episode. The original score for the series is composed by Yuki Kajiura. 


Episode list

Sword Art Online

Sword Art Online: Extra Edition 
Sword Art Online: Extra Edition is a special anime episode which was simulcast worldwide on December 31, 2013. In Japan, it was premiered on two broadcast channels: Tokyo MX and BS11. While in other countries, the special was streamed via the Internet on Daisuki and Crunchyroll. The extra edition was directed by Tomohiko Itō and screenplayed by the creator, Reki Kawahara, and Munemasa Nakamoto. It recounts the events of the original Sword Art Online anime, told in retrospect by the series characters and features new footage.

"Crossing Field" by LiSA, "Overfly" by Luna Haruna, and "Innocence" by Eir Aoi are all insert songs.

Media release

Japanese release
Aniplex, in partnership with Sony Music Entertainment Japan, distributed the episodes in nine volumes in DVD and Blu-ray format across Japan. Sword Art Online: Extra Edition was released on April 23, 2014, in DVD and Blu-ray limited editions, including a bonus Sword Art Offline: Extra Edition episode.

English release
In North America, Aniplex of America released the series in four DVD and Blu-ray volumes beginning on August 13, 2013. In Australasia, Madman Entertainment released volume one in DVD and Blu-ray on December 18, 2013, and concluded with volume four on March 19, 2014. In Europe, Manga Entertainment began to release the anime on December 16, 2013. Sword Art Online: Extra Edition was licensed by Aniplex of America and released by Blu-ray and DVD in North America on December 23, 2014.

Sword Art Offline
Sword Art Offline is a series of bonus episodes released in their own DVD and Blu-ray volumes in Japan. The show has 10 episodes, including the extra edition. Aniplex of America announced that they will include those episodes in the English version of the volumes with English subtitles.

Notes

References

External links

 Sword Art Online Official anime website 
 Sword Art Online Official anime website

Sword Art Online episode lists
2012 Japanese television seasons
Sword Art Online